Edna Payne (December 5, 1891 – January 31, 1953) was an American silent screen motion picture actress. She was not in any feature-length films, but is regarded as a "pioneer" in the film industry because she was in many short films from 1911 through 1917.

Career
Her parents were both stage actors, so Payne began her career as a child in vaudeville, making her movie debut in Higgenses Versus Judsons (1911). She played the lead in reel dramas, and later in a few reel westerns including The Girl Stage Driver (1914).   Although her film career was confined to the 1910s, she took part in countless productions.

Family
She was married to actor Jack Rollens, whom she divorced in 1925.  She had two children, Edna J, born in 1919, and Jack A, born in 1921.

Notes

External links

1891 births
1953 deaths
American silent film actresses
Burials at Hollywood Forever Cemetery
Vaudeville performers
20th-century American actresses